Indians on Vacation is a novel by Canadian writer Thomas King, published in 2020 by HarperCollins. The novel focuses on Bird and Mimi, a First Nations couple who are travelling in Europe following the discovery of a trove of old postcards from Mimi's late uncle Leroy, who absconded with a valuable family heirloom 100 years earlier but never returned.

The novel won the 2021 Stephen Leacock Memorial Medal for Humour. It was longlisted for the 2020 Giller Prize, and shortlisted for the Governor General's Award for English-language fiction at the 2020 Governor General's Awards.

References

2020 Canadian novels
Novels by Thomas King (novelist)
HarperCollins books